Man Key is an island in the Florida Keys in Monroe County, Florida, United States. It is within the boundaries of the Key West National Wildlife Refuge.

Located in the Outlying Islands of the Florida Keys, it is in the southern Mule Keys that are 9 miles (15 km) west of Key West.

It is composed of three separate islets.

It is east of  Ballast Key (24°31′23.0″N)which is the farthest south island, and it is also east of Woman Key. To the north of Man Key is Barracouta Key

References

Islands of the Florida Keys
Islands of Monroe County, Florida
Islands of Florida